This is a list of the governors of the province of Balkh, Afghanistan.

Governors of Balkh Province

See also
 List of current governors of Afghanistan

Notes

Balkh